Dundubia is a genus of cicadas (Hemiptera: Cicadidae) in the subfamily Cicadinae and the type genus of the tribe Dundubiini.  

The name Dundubia is derived from Sanskrit दुंदुभि (dundubhi), meaning 'drum'.  A characteristic feature is the pair of long lobes covering the tymbals on the underside of the male abdomen.

Description
The head is triangular with a prominent large forewing margin and a forehead with a short longitudinal groove in the middle.  The fairly prominent eyes, are large and oval.  The prothorax is not expanded at the sides.

This genus is notable for the extraordinarily large opercula covering the tymbals and extending down much the abdomen in male insects.

Species

The Global Biodiversity Information Facility lists:
 Dundubia andamansidensis (Boulard, 2001)
 Dundubia annandalei Boulard, 2007
 Dundubia ayutthaya Beuk, 1996
 Dundubia cochlearata Overmeer & Duffels, 1967
 Dundubia crepitans Boulard, 2005
 Dundubia dubia Lee, 2009
 Dundubia emanatura Distant, 1889
 Dundubia ensifera Bloem & Duffels, 1976
 Dundubia euterpe Bloem & Duffels, 1976
 Dundubia feae (Distant, 1892)
 Dundubia flava Lee, 2009
 Dundubia gravesteini Duffels, 1976
 Dundubia hainanensis (Distant, 1901)
 Dundubia hastata (Moulton, J.C., 1923)
 Dundubia jacoona (Distant, 1888)
 Dundubia kebuna Moulton, J.C., 1923
 Dundubia laterocurvata Beuk, 1996
 Dundubia myitkyinensis Beuk, 1996
 Dundubia nagarasingna Distant, 1881
 Dundubia nigripes (Moulton, J.C., 1923)
 Dundubia nigripesoides Boulard, 2008
 Dundubia oopaga (Distant, 1881)
 Dundubia rafflesii Distant, 1883
 Dundubia rhamphodes Bloem & Duffels, 1976
 Dundubia rufivena Walker, F., 1850
 Dundubia simalurensis Overmeer & Duffels, 1967
 Dundubia sinbyudaw Beuk, 1996
 Dundubia solokensis Overmeer & Duffels, 1967
 Dundubia somraji Boulard, 2003
 Dundubia spiculata Noualhier, 1896
 Dundubia terpsichore (Walker, F., 1850)
 Dundubia vaginata (Fabricius, 1787) - type species (as Tettigonia vaginata Fabricius, 1787)
 Dundubia vanna Chou, Lei, Li, Lu & Yao, 1997

References

External links 

Hemiptera of Asia
Dundubiini
Cicadidae genera